National Secondary Route 131, or just Route 131 (or ) is a National Road Route of Costa Rica, located in the Alajuela, Puntarenas provinces.

Description
In Alajuela province the route covers San Mateo canton (San Mateo, Jesús María, Labrador districts).

In Puntarenas province the route covers Esparza canton (Espíritu Santo, San Juan Grande, Macacona, San Rafael districts).

References

Highways in Costa Rica